The Syro-Malabar Catholic Eparchy of Rajkot  is an Eastern Catholic eparchy in India under the Syro-Malabar Catholic Church. It was created by Pope Paul VI's Bull "De recta fidelium" in 1977, separating it from the Diocese of Ahmedabad. Its cathedral is Sacred Heart Syro-Malabar Cathedral, Rajkot.

History
On 16 July 2010, Pope Benedict XVI named Mar Jose Chittooparambil as the bishop of the Syro-Malabar Catholic eparchy of Rajkot. The bishop-elect was born in 1954 in Neeleswaram, India, was ordained to the priesthood in 1985, and is currently Prior General of St. Xavier's Province in Rajkot. He succeeds bishop Mar Gregory Karotemprel, whose resignation the Pope accepted upon having reached the age limit. (All bishops of local churches, or dioceses, whose wider churches are in communion with the Pope, must submit their resignation for possible acceptance at age 75, though the resignations are usually only accepted later.)

Former bishops 
 Mar Jonas Thaliath
 Mar Gregory Karotemprel

Schools 

 St. Xavier's High School, Bhuj

External links
Syro-Malabar Catholic Diocese of Rajkot Catholic-Hierarchy

Syro-Malabar Catholic dioceses
Eastern Catholic dioceses in India
Christian organizations established in 1977
Christianity in Gujarat
1977 establishments in Gujarat